What You Need is the third album by R&B group Side Effect. Released in 1976, this was their second album for Fantasy Records.

Track listing
Always There  5:04 (Paul Allen, Ronnie Laws, William Jeffrey)
Keep That Same Old Feeling  7:06 (Wayne Henderson)
Time Has No Ending  3:55 (Henderson, Esau Joyner)	
S.O.S  4:06 (Helen Lowe, August W. Johnson)
Honky Tonk Scat  3:45 (Johnson, Henderson)
Finally Found Someone  2:53 (Joyner)
Changes  3:36 (Gregory Matta, Louie Patton)
Life Is What You Make It  2:54 (Johnson)
I Know You Can  6:21 (Johnson)

Charts

Singles

References

External links
Side Effect-What you Need at Discogs

1976 albums
Fantasy Records albums
Side Effect albums
Albums produced by Wayne Henderson (musician)